ABSA Oval, previously known as University of Port Elizabeth No 1 Oval is a cricket ground in Gqeberha, South Africa.  Eastern Province and their 'B' side have played first-class and List A cricket at the ground irregularly since 1982.  The ground has also hosted one women's One Day International, between England women and South Africa women in 2004.

References

Cricket grounds in South Africa
Nelson Mandela University
Sports venues in the Eastern Cape
Sport in Port Elizabeth